"Androgynous" is a song by The Replacements featured on their 1984 album Let It Be. The song, which has been described as "decades ahead of its time" describes in positive terms a romantic relationship between two gender non-conforming individuals, and expresses hope that in future such people and their personal relationships will be more accepted.

The song was covered by Crash Test Dummies and released as the third and final single from their 1991 debut album The Ghosts That Haunt Me.

Joan Jett also covered the song on both her albums Naked and Sinner.

Jubilee also covered the song. Their version appeared as the B-side on their first single, "Rebel Hiss".

In 2015, the song was covered by Joan Jett again, along with Laura Jane Grace of Against Me! and Miley Cyrus, for Cyrus's Backyard Sessions video series to support the Happy Hippie Foundation, an organization founded by Cyrus to support homeless LGBT youth. The song was also covered by Ezra Furman on her 2016 EP Songs by Others.

UK indie band Peace (band) use the first part of the song as an intro to their song I'm A Girl on occasion.

Towards the end of the song, you can hear Paul Westerberg sing the words "Jefferson's Cock".  Occasionally, The Replacements would play gigs in Minneapolis under this name, with the band members wearing dresses.

Music videos
Crash Test Dummies' music video for "Androgynous" features the band performing at a fair attended by many gender queer individuals. Joan Jett's music video features Jett singing the song as a story from a children's book in a library in front of a group of young children, with the details and the characters of Dick and Jane from the song portrayed in the video. The video features fellow musician John Doe as Dick, the author of the book, and with Jett portraying Jane. U.S. Bombs singer Duane Peters also has a cameo as young Jane's father.

Charts
Crash Test Dummies version

References

1984 songs
1991 singles
The Replacements (band) songs
Crash Test Dummies songs
LGBT-related songs
Songs written by Paul Westerberg